The Workers' Party was a political party founded in 1992 and led by Doğu Perinçek. It has its roots in the Revolutionary Workers' and Peasants' Party of Turkey (TİİKP), the Workers' and Peasants' Party of Turkey (TİKP) and the Socialist Party (SP) which was banned by the Constitutional Court in 1992. They are known as "Aydınlıkçılar" (Clarifiers) due to their daily newspaper Aydınlık ("Clarify" or "Enlightenment") that has a circulation of 63,000.

During a general assembly on 15 February 2015, the Workers' Party was rebranded and changed its name to Patriotic Party, with Perinçek remaining as leader.

Overview
The İP traditionally combined Maoist rhetoric with a hardline left-wing Kemalism called ulusalcılık. Although they accept scientific socialism as their main ideology, they have a more patriotic ideology than other left-wing parties in Turkey. Their revolutionary strategy is based on "National Democratic Revolution", which is close to Mao Zedong's "New Democratic Revolution". İP supports Stalin's "Socialism in One Country" thesis, rather than Mirsaid Sultan-Galiev's "national communism" thesis. Such that, Mehmet Bedri Gültekin, deputy chairman of the party, wrote a book on Sultan-Galiev's counter-revolutionary role. They admire the founder of the Turkish republic, Mustafa Kemal Atatürk (who is considered a "left-wing bourgeois democratic revolutionary" by Chairman Perinçek ) as much as they admire Marxist revolutionary leaders like Vladimir Lenin, Joseph Stalin and Mao Zedong. They also promote alliances with nations they believe have anti-imperialist tendencies (such as Venezuela, Brazil and Cuba) and oppose the existence of American expansionism - (such as India, China and Russia).

İP states that a brotherhood based solution to the Kurdish question must exclude imperialist initiative in the Middle East. They claim that the Kurdistan Workers' Party (PKK) has been completely under the control of the USA since the Gulf War. İP asserts that it is still possible to unite Turkish and Kurdish people in Turkey within the borders of an anti-imperialist nation state which will be established through a democratic revolution. According to them, separatism became a tool of American imperialism in breaking national markets in the Third World in post-Cold War conditions. Although they traverse separation, they also defend democratic rights and freedoms of Kurds in Turkey. For İP, the key tool to solve the Kurdish problem is to demolish "feudal structures" in Kurdish provinces and make peasants "free citizens".

Wings
The youth student wing of İP is known as Öncü Gençlik (Vanguard Youth).
The women wing of İP is known as Öncü Kadın (Vanguard Women).

Media
Aydınlık (Clarity), daily newspaper.
Aydınlık Daily, news portal in English.
Teori (Theory), monthly theory and strategy review.
Bilim ve Ütopya (Science and Utopia), monthly science journal.
Ulusal Kanal (National Channel), television station.
Kaynak Yayınları (Source Publications), publisher.

Election results
1995 general election: 61,428 votes (0.22%)
1999 general election: 57,593 votes (0.18%)
2002 general election: 160,227 votes (0.51%)
2007 general election: 127,220 votes (0.36%)

References

1992 establishments in Turkey
2015 disestablishments in Turkey
Defunct socialist parties in Turkey
Kemalist political parties
Defunct Maoist parties
Maoist organizations in Turkey
Left-wing nationalist parties
Defunct nationalist parties in Turkey
Political parties established in 1992
Political parties disestablished in 2015